The Annunciation with St. Margaret and St. Ansanus  is a painting by the Italian Gothic artists Simone Martini and Lippo Memmi, now housed in the Uffizi Gallery in Florence, Italy. It is a wooden triptych painted in tempera and gold, with a central panel having double size. Considered Martini's masterwork and one of the most outstanding works of Gothic painting, the work was originally painted for a side altar in the Siena Cathedral.

History
The painting originally decorated the altar of St. Ansanus in the Cathedral of Siena, and had been commissioned as part of a cycle of four altarpieces dedicated to the city's patrons saints (St. Ansanus, St. Sabinus of Spoleto, St. Crescentius and St. Victor) during 1330–1350. These included the Presentation at the Temple by Ambrogio Lorenzetti (altar of St. Crescentius, 1342), the Nativity of the Virgin by Pietro Lorenzetti (1342, Altar of St. Sabinus), and a Nativity, now disassembled, attributed to Bartolomeo Bulgarini from 1351 (altar of St. Victor). All the paintings should represent stories of the Life of the Madonna, and were crowned by Duccio di Buoninsegna's Maestà. The artists' use of expensive lacquer, extensive gold leafing and the difficult to obtain lapis lazuli in the painting demonstrates the communal prestige of the commission.

The date of the painting is specified in a fragment of the original frame, now embedded in the 19th-century renovation. It lists the name of Simone Martini and his brother-in-law Lippo Memmi, although it is unknown which parts they executed. A hypothesis is that Martini painted the central panel, while Memmi was responsible for the side saints and the tondoes with prophets in the upper part.

The work, in both size and style, has no similarities with any other contemporary painting in Italy. It can be compared instead to French illuminated manuscripts of that time, as well as to paintings from Germany or England. His "northern European" style granted Martini a call from the papal court in Avignon, where there were Italian but no Florentine painters, as the Giottesque classical manner was met with little interest by the Gothic culture of the area.

The painting remained in the cathedral until 1799, when Grand Duke Peter Leopold had it moved to Florence in exchange of two canvasses by Luca Giordano. The original frame, carved by Paolo di Camporegio and gilt by Memmi, was renovated in 1420 and replaced by a modern one in the 19th century.

Description
The work is composed of a large central panel depicting the Annunciation, and two side panels with St. Ansanus (left), and female saint, generarally identified with St. Maxima or St. Margaret, in the right, and four tondos in the cusps: Jeremiah, Ezechiel, Isiah and Daniel.

The Annunciation shows the archangel Gabriel entering the house of the Virgin Mary to tell her that she will soon bear the child Jesus, whose name means "savior". Gabriel holds an olive branch in his hand, a traditional symbol of peace, while pointing at the Holy Ghost's dove with the other. The dove is descending from heaven, from the center of the mandorla of eight angels above, about to enter the Virgin's right ear. In fact, along the path of the dove, viewers see Gabriel's utterance:  ("Hail, full of grace, the Lord is with thee."). The angel's mantle shows a detailed "tartar cloth" pattern and fine gilt feathers.

Mary, sitting on a throne, is portrayed at the moment that she is startled out of her reading, reacting with a graceful and composed reluctance, looking with surprise at the celestial messenger. Her dress has an arabesque-like pattern.

At the sides, the two patrons saints of the cathedral are separated by the central scene by two decorate twisting columns. The background, completely gilt, has a vase of lilies, an allegory of purity often associated to the Virgin Mary.

The use of a Gothic line, plus such realistic elements as the book, the vase, the throne, the pavement in perspective, the realistic action of the two figures and their subtle nuances of character are a substantial detachment from the bi-dimensionality typical of Byzantine art.

See also
 Presentation at the Temple by Ambrogio Lorenzetti

References

Notes

General references

External links
 
 High resolution image via the Google Art Project

 
Paintings depicting the Annunciation
Triptychs
1330s paintings
Paintings in the collection of the Uffizi
 Paintings on gold backgrounds
Paintings of Margaret the Virgin